Chitagá is a Colombian municipality and town located in the department of North Santander. The town has a population of 11,684 people and an elevation of 2,350 metres above sea level.

References

  Government of Norte de Santander - Chitaga
  geomundo - Chitaga, Bicentennial
Spanish Wikipedia Article https://es.wikipedia.org/wiki/Chitag%C3%A1

Municipalities of the Norte de Santander Department